Assam Cricket Association Stadium, also known as ACA Stadium or Barsapara Cricket Stadium, is a cricket stadium in Barsapara, Guwahati, Assam, India.  The entire stadium project's cost over Rs 2300 crore. It was inaugurated by Assam CM Sarbananda Sonowal on 10 October 2017. The Cricket Stadium is India's 49th international cricket venue. First International cricket match played here was a T20I between India and Australia in 2017, which was won by Australia. This state-of-the-art cricket stadium hosts domestic and international cricket matches.
It is the largest sports stadium in Northeast India.

History
The foundation stone of the stadium was laid by then Chief Minister Tarun Gogoi in June 2004 and he again laid the foundation stone of the club house and stand of the stadium in July 2007 in the presence of then BCCI secretary Niranjan Shah.

An area of 59 bighas of land was allotted to the Assam Cricket Association by the State Government and after clearing a portion from encroachers, Assam Cricket Association started construction in the year 2006. The Assam Cricket Association (ACA) has hosted an unofficial match in the stadium which was initially a dumping ground. In 2009, Assam Cricket Association officials hoped that within one year they will be able to complete the remaining work of the stadium which will be of an international standard.

On 4 November 2012, the East Zone Senior Women's Interstate One-day Championship match between Assam and Odisha became the first match to be played at the ground. In the 2013–14 Ranji Trophy season, the ground hosted four matches. Assam against Kerala was the first first-class match.

On 10 October 2017, the stadium hosted its first T20 international. The match was played between Australia and hosts India, Australia won the game by 8 wickets. In this match, the newly inaugurated stadium recorded an attendance of 38,132.

On 21 October 2018, the stadium hosted its first ODI international. The match was played between hosts India and West Indies cricket team, India won the game by 8 wickets.

On 4 March 2019 until 9 March 2019, the ground hosted Women's International Cricket for the first time. Three Women's Twenty20 International matches were played between England women's cricket team and hosts Indian women's cricket team. England women's cricket team won the WT20I series 3–0.

List of centuries

Key
 * denotes that the batsman was not out.
 Inns. denotes the number of the innings in the match.
 Balls denotes the number of balls faced in an innings.
 NR denotes that the number of balls was not recorded.
 Parentheses next to the player's score denotes his century number at Edgbaston.
 The column title Date refers to the date the match started.
 The column title Result refers to the player's team result

One day internationals

See also
 Nehru Stadium
 Indira Gandhi Athletic Stadium
 Northeast Frontier Railway Stadium

References
External Linke

Crik10 – Ground page 
Cricketarchive – Ground Page
 Cricinfo – Ground Page

Cricket grounds in Assam
Sports venues in Guwahati
Memorials to Bhupen Hazarika
Sports venues completed in 2012
2012 establishments in Assam